Dame Jennifer Roberts, DBE, styled The Hon. Mrs Justice Roberts, is a judge of the High Court of England and Wales.

She was educated at the University of Southampton (LLB). She was called to the bar at Inner Temple in 1988. She has been a judge of the High Court of Justice (Family Division) since 2014.

References

Living people
Alumni of the University of Southampton
Members of the Inner Temple
Family Division judges
British women judges
Place of birth missing (living people)
Dames Commander of the Order of the British Empire
Year of birth missing (living people)